The following outline is provided as an overview of and topical guide to Odisha:

Odisha – one of the 29 states of India, located in the eastern coast. Odisha has  of coastline along the Bay of Bengal on its east, from Balasore to Malkangiri. It is the 9th largest state by area, and the 11th largest by population. Odia (formerly known as Oriya) is the official and most widely spoken language, spoken by 33.2 million according to the 2001 Census.

 loc -is  in0

General reference

Names 

 Common name: Odisha
 Pronunciation: ;
 Official name: State of Odisha
 Originally known as : Kalinga (India) 
 Nicknames
Utkala
 Adjectivals
 Odia
 Demonyms
Odia
 Abbreviations and name codes
 ISO 3166-2 code: IN-OR  
 Vehicle registration code: OD

Rankings (amongst India's states) 

 by population: 11th
 by area (2011 census): 9th
 by crime rate (2015): 16th
 by gross domestic product (GDP) (2014): 15th
by Human Development Index (HDI): 
by life expectancy at birth: 
by literacy rate:

Geography of Odisha 

Geography of Odisha
 Odisha is: an Indian state
 Population of Odisha: 
 Area of Odisha:  
 Atlas of Odisha

Location of Odisha 
 Odisha is situated within the following regions:
 Northern Hemisphere
 Eastern Hemisphere
 Eurasia
 Asia
 South Asia
 Indian subcontinent
 India
 East India
 Time zone:  Indian Standard Time (UTC+05:30)

Environment of Odisha

Protected areas in Odisha 
Baisipalli
Balimela
Bhitarkanika
Mangroves
Karlapat
Nandankanan
Saptasajya
Satkosia Tiger Reserve
Sunabeda Tiger Reserve
Ushakothi

Natural geographic features of Odisha 

 Rivers of Odisha

Regions of Odisha

Administrative divisions of Odisha

Districts of Odisha 

 Districts of Odisha

Municipalities of Odisha 

Municipalities of Odisha

 Capital of Odisha: Bhubaneswar Capital of Odisha
 Cities of Odisha

Demography of Odisha 

Demographics of Odisha

Government and politics of Odisha 

Politics of Odisha

 Form of government: Indian state government (parliamentary system of representative democracy)
 Capital of Odisha: Capital of Odisha
 Elections in Odisha
 (specific elections)

Union government in Odisha 
 Rajya Sabha members from Odisha
 Odisha Pradesh Congress Committee
 Indian general election, 2009 (Odisha)
 Indian general election, 2014 (Odisha)

Branches of the government of Odisha 

Government of Odisha

Executive branch of the government of Odisha 

 Head of state: Governor of Odisha, 
 Head of government: Chief Minister of Odisha,

Legislative branch of the government of Odisha 

Odisha Legislative Assembly
 Constituencies of Odisha Legislative Assembly

Judicial branch of the government of Odisha

Law and order in Odisha 

 Law enforcement in Odisha
 Odisha Police

History of Odisha 

History of Odisha

History of Odisha, by period

Prehistoric Odisha

Ancient Odisha

Medieval Odisha

Colonial Odisha

Contemporary Odisha

History of Odisha, by region 

 Historic sites in Odisha

History of Odisha, by subject

Culture of Odisha 

Culture of Odisha
 Cuisine of Odisha
 Monuments in Odisha
 Monuments of National Importance in Odisha
 State Protected Monuments in Odisha
 World Heritage Sites in Odisha

Art in Odisha 
 Cinema of Odisha
 Music of Odisha
 Odisssy Dance

Languages of Odisha 
 Odia
 Sambalpuri 
 Hindi
 Bengali
 Telugu

People of Odisha 

 People from Odisha

Religion in Odisha 

Religion in Odisha
 Christianity in Odisha
 Hinduism in Odisha

Sports in Odisha 

Sports in Odisha
 Cricket in Odisha
 Odisha Cricket Association
 Odisha cricket team
 Football in Odisha
 Odisha football team

Symbols of Odisha 

Symbols of Odisha
 State animal:Sambar
 State bird:bhadabhadaliya
 State flower:
 State seal: Seal of Odisha
 State tree:

Economy and infrastructure of Odisha 

Economy of Odisha
 Tourism in Odisha
 Transport in Odisha
 Airports in Odisha

Education in Odisha 

Education in Odisha
 Institutions of higher education in Odisha

Health in Odisha 

Health in Odisha

See also 

 Outline of India

References

External links 

 
Odisha
Odisha